Jawor-Kolonia  is a village in the administrative district of Gmina Mniszków, within Opoczno County, Łódź Voivodeship, in central Poland.

References

Jawor-Kolonia